Otitoma nereidum is a species of sea snail, a marine gastropod mollusk in the family Pseudomelatomidae, the turrids and allies.

Description
The length of the shell varies between 6.5 mm and 12 mm.

Distribution
This marine species occurs in the Pacific Ocean off the Fiji Islands and the Philippines

References

 Morassi M., Nappo A. & Bonfitto A. (2017). New species of the genus Otitoma Jousseaume, 1898 (Pseudomelatomidae, Conoidea) from the Western Pacific Ocean. European Journal of Taxonomy. 304: 1-30

External links
 Gastropods.com: Otitoma nereidum

nereidum
Gastropods described in 2017